Gail Charlene Boggs (born August 10, 1951) is an American actress. She played Louise Brown in the 1990 film Ghost.

Career

Gail Boggs, the daughter of Willie Boggs, a tree surgeon, and Alice, a dietitian, described having always dreamed of being a Broadway star. Her professional acting break came in 1971 playing Silvia with a touring group in Australia in a pop-rock version of Shakespeare's play The Two Gentlemen of Verona. She signed with William Morris Agency and went on to act in several plays, including rock opera Mother Earth, an off-Broadway revue, Jesus Christ Superstar, and Candide.

In a 1975 interview, she reported that a chance meeting with Todd Rundgren at an intersection in Manhattan led her to singing backup alongside her friend Darcy Miller and Laura Nyro on Felix Cavaliere's second album, Destiny, before singing with Hall & Oates on War Babies as well as with Carly Simon on Spy and Come Upstairs. During the mid-1970s, Boggs provided vocals and percussion as a member of "The Striders" alongside "The Original Flying Machine"-alum Joel "Bishop" O'Brien and Robbie Dupree. Boggs was also a vocalist in David Sancious's short-lived band "Tone".

In 1984, Boggs starred in the one-woman cabaret nightclub act The Gail Boggs Show at "Upstairs at Greene Street". The show ran weekly for the next year and a half. Boggs was one of the first to hear a recording of Madonna's "Like a Virgin" and she pushed Grammy Award-winning writer and producer Nile Rodgers to release the song as the first single off Madonna's then-upcoming album. Images of Boggs are found in the Martha Swope archive at the New York Public Library.

Personal life
Boggs was married to Eric Larson, a voice actor and music editor. They have two daughters, Willie and Mattie, a former gymnast.

Acting
1971 The Two Gentlemen of Verona (Silvia)
1972 Derek Walcott's Ti-Jean and His Brothers
1972 Mother Earth at the Belasco Theatre
1974 Candide (Penitente / Whore / Houri) at the Brooklyn Academy of Music 
1979 Ain't Misbehavin'
1982 Elizabeth Swados's Lullabye and Goodnight (Velvet Puppy)
1987 The Bronx Zoo (Roz Hemphill)
1988 And God Created Woman (Denise)
1989 The Boss (Luanda)
1990 Ghost (Louise Brown, sister of Ode Mae Brown played by Whoopi Goldberg)
1991 Curly Sue (Anise Hall)
1993 Cancelled Lives: Letters from the Inside
1995 Get Smart (2nd nurse)
1995 Boy Meets World (nurse)
1999 EDtv
2020 Better Things

Citations

References

Further reading

External links 

1951 births
Living people
African-American actresses
American film actresses
People from Montclair, New Jersey
Actresses from New Jersey
21st-century African-American people
21st-century African-American women
20th-century African-American people
20th-century African-American women